Underlayment may refer to:

 Underlay, a material placed underneath floor carpet, other flooring materials, or mattress bedding
 Underlayment, a water-resistant or waterproof layer used beneath many types of commercially available roofing material
 Bituminous waterproofing, systems designed to protect residential and commercial buildings
 SDM strength film, a kind of High Density Polyethylene (HDPE) Cross Laminated Strength Film
 Tar paper, a heavy-duty paper used in construction
 Underlayment in road construction such as nonwoven fabric
 Underlay, a material in sewing
 Underlay, a technique in some types of surgery such as myringoplasty
 Underlay, a material in printing